Pandit Shree Ram Sharma metro station (formerly known as Modern Industrial Estate metro station) is a station on the Green Line of the Delhi Metro and is located in the Jhajjar district of Haryana. It is an elevated station and opened on 24 June 2018.

Pandit Shree Ram Sharma was born in Village Sarai Aurangabad just 3 km from Bahadurgarh city on Bahadurgarh–Beri Road.

Station layout

Facilities

List of available ATM at Modern Industrial Estate metro station are

Connections

Exits

See also
List of Delhi Metro stations
Transport in Delhi
Delhi Metro Rail Corporation
Delhi Suburban Railway
List of rapid transit systems in India

References

External links

 Delhi Metro Rail Corporation Ltd. (Official site) 
 Delhi Metro Annual Reports
 
 UrbanRail.Net – descriptions of all metro systems in the world, each with a schematic map showing all stations.

Delhi Metro stations
Railway stations in Jhajjar district